Olympia State Forest is a former state forest located in Bath County, Kentucky, United States and covering 780 acres. It was located west of Morehead, Kentucky. The forest has an average elevation of 892 feet (272 m).

References

Kentucky state forests
Protected areas of Bath County, Kentucky
Protected areas established in 1930
1930 establishments in Kentucky